Esther Hayut (born 16 October 1953) is the Chief Justice of the Supreme Court of Israel. She was sworn in on 26 October 2017, and is expected to serve as Chief Justice until October 2023.

Early life
Esther "Esti" Avni was born in Herzliya, Israel, in the Shaviv ma'abara (today the Yad HaTesha neighborhood) to Yehuda and Yehudit Avni, who were both Romanian Holocaust survivors. Her parents divorced when she was a toddler, and her father emigrated to the United Kingdom. She grew up in her grandparents' home in the Neve Amal neighborhood of Herzliya. At age 17, she moved to Eilat to live with her mother, who had remarried. She completed high school in Eilat in 1971. After graduating high school, she was conscripted into the Israel Defense Forces, where she served in the military music band of Central Command. After her discharge from the army, Hayut attended law school at Tel Aviv University, graduating in 1977. During her law studies, she also met her husband, David Hayut, with whom she has two sons. Hayut interned at the law firm of Haim Yosef Zadok, a former Israeli Minister of Justice, where she stayed on to work as an associate lawyer between 1977 and 1985. After leaving the firm, Hayut opened an independent office together with her husband, specializing in commercial and tort law. In 2022, Hayut was awarded by Forbes as one of the 50 over 50 women leading the way throughout Europe, the Middle East and Africa.

Judicial career
In March 1990 Hayut was appointed as a judge in the Tel Aviv Magistrate Court, and in 1996 was appointed to the Tel Aviv District Court where she gained tenure in 1997. In March 2003 Hayut was appointed a Justice of the Supreme Court of Israel, where she gained tenure in March 2004.

In May 2015 Hayut was appointed Chairperson of the Central Election Committee for the 20th Knesset.

Hayut was elected to replace Miriam Naor as the Chief Justice of the Supreme Court in 2017 and serve as such until 2023, according to the seniority method used in Israel.

See also
Women in Israel

References

1953 births
Judges of the Supreme Court of Israel
Chief justices of the Supreme Court of Israel
Israeli women judges
People from Eilat
People from Herzliya
Tel Aviv University alumni
Living people
Women chief justices
Israeli people of Romanian-Jewish descent